"When I Come Around" is a song released by American rock band Green Day. It is the tenth track on their third studio album, Dookie, and was released as the fourth single from that album in December 1994, being physically released on January 31, 1995.  It was played live as early as 1992. "When I Come Around" was Green Day's most popular radio single in their early career, peaking at No. 6 on the Billboard Hot 100 Airplay chart. This was their highest-charting radio single until 2004's "Boulevard of Broken Dreams" peaked at No. 2.

"When I Come Around" was one of the most successful songs of 1995. It topped Billboards Alternative Songs chart for seven weeks, and it also hit number two on the Mainstream Rock Tracks. It was Green Day's third straight number-one from Dookie (after "Longview" and "Basket Case"). As of August 2010, "When I Come Around" has sold 639,000 copies. This makes it the band's second best-selling single of the 1990s, behind only their 1997 hit "Good Riddance (Time of Your Life)".

Critical reception
Music & Media commented, "We asked Nick Lowe, one-time producer in the first wave of punk, what's the difference between then and now? He answered: 'Green Day can really play.' Life is sometimes so simple." British magazine Music Week gave "When I Come Around" three out of five, writing, "The fourth track to be lifted from their gold-selling Dookie album lacks the character and charm of 'Basket Case' but shouldn't harm their chart fortunes if their US success is anything to go by."

Music video
The music video for the song is directed by Mark Kohr. It shows the band walking to different places, like the Mission District and the Powell Street Station in San Francisco and Berkeley, California at night, along with various scenes of people doing common things all inter-related. One of the first scenes of the video eventually leads back to the scene at the end. The band's touring guitarist Jason White can be seen in the video with his girlfriend.

Before the video was filmed, MTV aired a live performance of the song by the band at the 1994 Woodstock Festival.

MTV's Ultimate Albums: Dookie special credited the simple horizontally-striped sweater worn by Armstrong in the video for starting a fashion trend of similar sweaters.

Track listing

Initial pressing
"When I Come Around" – 2:58
"Coming Clean" (live) – 1:36
"She" (live) – 2:14
(Live tracks recorded November 18, 1994, at Aragon Ballroom, Chicago)

AU single
"When I Come Around" – 2:58
"Longview" (live) – 3:30
"Burnout" (live) – 2:11
"2,000 Light Years Away" (live) – 2:48
(Live tracks recorded March 11, 1994, at Jannus Landing, St. Petersburg, Florida; Tracks 2-3 are the same on the Live Tracks EP; Track 4 has an extended intro, but is the same performance)

7" picture disc
Side A
"When I Come Around" – 2:58

Side B
"She" (live) – 2:14

Charts and certifications

Weekly charts

Year-end charts

Certifications

Use in media
"When I Come Around" was featured in South Park episode "Hummels & Heroin", sung in the style of a barbershop quartet. It was also featured in the Green Day-themed Rock Band game Green Day: Rock Band. It has been featured in multiple media such as the trailer for Blast from the Past and the episode in Hindsight.

References

External links
 

1995 singles
Green Day songs
Songs written by Billie Joe Armstrong
Song recordings produced by Rob Cavallo
Reprise Records singles
Warner Music Group singles